Fátima Choi Mei Lei (born 1958) MSc, BSc was a Commissioner of Audit in Macau.

Born in Macau, Choi obtained a Master of Science degree in statistics and Bachelor of Science degree in mathematics from the University of Essex.

She was an assistant researcher in Hong Kong Polytechnic University and Chinese University of Hong Kong from 1985 to 1986. She joined the statistics and census department of the Macanese government. Choi held other positions in the local government:

 Senior Technician
 Department Chief of Social Affairs and Accountants 1991-1995
 Deputy Director 1995-1997
 Director 1997-1999

Choi was the first Chinese official at the director's level after localization in Macau prior to the handover.

References

1958 births
Living people
Macau women in politics
Macau people
Alumni of the University of Essex